Köhm is a small river of North Rhine-Westphalia, Germany. It flows into the Niers near Erkelenz-Keyenberg. Its upper course no longer exists due to lignite mining (Garzweiler surface mine).

'Köhm-Lied'
A traditional song exists about the Köhm river in the Borschemich dialect of German:
Kütt dr Sonndachnommedach
wehs kehner us noch en
löf dat Dres de Stros eraf
flöck nom Onkel hin
säht em dann jet in et Uer
hei dat wütt jemaat
hei dat jöff en Sondertour
hei dat jöff en Fahrt
Jo mir fahre med nem Böötche ob dr Kue´hm
allemole un et Dres mit singem Ühem
un dat Dres dat kritt dr zedder
be demm janz glitter
jo no Mod - jo no Mod - jo no Mod
allemole op dem klene Paddelboot !

See also
List of rivers of North Rhine-Westphalia

Rivers of North Rhine-Westphalia
Rivers of Germany